Ian Jordan (19 June 1927 – 1993) was a Guyanese cricketer. He played in five first-class matches for British Guiana from 1947 to 1958.

See also
 List of Guyanese representative cricketers

References

External links
 

1927 births
1993 deaths
Guyanese cricketers
Guyana cricketers
Sportspeople from Georgetown, Guyana